Christoph Thomas Scheffler (sometimes written Schäffler, December 20, 1699 –  January 25, 1756) was a German painter of the rococo period. He is best known for his frescoes.

Scheffler was born in Mainburg and learned the trade of a painter from his father Wolfgang Scheffler. Between 1719 and 1722, he worked as a journeyman for Cosmas Damian Asam. In 1722, he joined the Jesuit Order as a lay brother and painted several churches for the order. After he had left the order in 1728, he settled in Augsburg, where he died in 1756.

Among his works are the frescoes of the  church in Heusenstamm, which was built by Balthasar Neumann for the Schönborn-Heusenstamm family, and those of the St. Paulinus' Church in Trier, funded by Elector Franz Georg von Schönborn. The frescoes in the chapel of the Deutschhaus in Mainz, painted by Scheffler, were destroyed during World War II.

References

Sources 

 archived link
 

1699 births
1756 deaths
People from Kelheim (district)
18th-century German painters
18th-century German male artists
German male painters
Fresco painters